The Brothers Brannagan is an American crime drama television series that aired in syndication from September 24, 1960, to July 15, 1961.

Synopsis
The Brothers Brannagan features fictitious detectives Mike and Bob Brannagan, portrayed, respectively, by Stephen Dunne and Mark Roberts. The pair operated out of the Mountain Shadows Resort Inn in Phoenix, Arizona. According to Alex McNeil's Total Television, the series was a low-budget offering.

Notable guest stars
Barney Phillips appeared in seven episodes as police Lieutenant Avery. Paul Bryar guest-starred three times as Lieutenant Ecklund, including the premiere episode, "Tune in for Murder", which also featured Vic Morrow as the character Locke. Marion Ross appeared in two episodes as Diane Warren. Joan Evans guest-starred in two episodes as Peggy Dodd.

Other guest stars included Ann McCrea as Martha in "The Grapefruit King", Richard Rust and Christopher Dark in "An Hour to Kill", John Dehner in "Three", Whit Bissell in "Delayed Payment", Elinor Donahue (with Marion Ross) in "Duet", child actor Bobby Driscoll in "The Twisted Root", Sterling Holloway and Steve Brodie in "Love Me, Love My Dog", Jackie Coogan in "The Damaged Dolls", Bing Russell in "Tough Guy", child actor Flip Mark in "A Friend to Man", Ruta Lee in "Shot in the Dark", Paul Richards in "Thunderbird", K.T. Stevens in "Wheel of Fortune", Ron Hagerthy in "Advantage: Death", Don Haggerty in "The Green Gamblers", Robert Harland and Gloria Talbott in "Terror in the Afternoon", Anne Helm in "Equinox", James Coburn in "Death Is Not Deductible", Madge Blake in "A View of Murder", Burt Reynolds in "Bordertown", Joanna Cook Moore in "A Matter of a Million", Kent Taylor as Ray Norton in "Her Brother's Keeper", Joan Tompkins as Martha in "The Twisted Root", and Ford Rainey in "The Hunter and the Hunted", the series finale.

References

External links
 

1960 American television series debuts
1961 American television series endings
1960s American crime drama television series
Black-and-white American television shows
English-language television shows
First-run syndicated television programs in the United States
Television series about brothers
Television series by CBS Studios
Television shows set in Phoenix, Arizona